The Old Campus is the oldest area of the Yale University campus in New Haven, Connecticut. It is the principal residence of Yale College freshmen and also contains offices for the academic departments of Classics, English, History, Comparative Literature, and Philosophy. Fourteen buildings—including eight dormitories and two chapels—surround a  courtyard with a main entrance from the New Haven Green known as Phelps Gate.

The Old Campus comprised most of Yale College's grounds between its arrival in New Haven in 1718 and its 20th-century expansion. Yale's first building in New Haven, the College House, was erected in 1718 on the Old Campus' southeast corner, fulfilling the city founders' wish to have a college near New Haven's Congregational church. It was joined by Connecticut Hall in 1750, a student dormitory and Yale's only surviving building from the colonial era. A linear building plan established in 1792, known as Old Brick Row, was the first campus plan in the United States and became a template for many American college campuses built in the 19th century. After 1870, the original plan gave way to the current quadrangle of dormitories, academic buildings, and chapels.

In addition to Connecticut Hall, the current buildings of Old Campus include most of the freshman dormitories of Yale College, Street Hall of the Yale University Art Gallery, and two buildings used for religious purpose: Battell Chapel, third in a succession of college chapels, and Dwight Hall, formerly the College Library. Although the current buildings have been renovated and their uses changed during the twentieth century, all were completed before 1928.

History

First building: Yale College House
When Yale College moved to New Haven in 1718, the town constructed its first building, the "College House," at the corner of College and Chapel Streets, where Bingham Hall now stands. The wood-framed structure contained all the functions of the college: student rooms, a library, and a combined chapel and dining hall. Falling into disrepair, this building was torn down in stages from 1775 to 1782.

Old Brick Row construction

Beginning in 1750 with the state-financed construction of Connecticut Hall, a student dormitory, the buildings of Old Brick Row were built over the next one hundred years. A chapel, later known as the Atheneum, joined the dormitory in 1761. During a 1792 disagreement over whether the next building should follow a linear pattern, preferred by Yale President Ezra Stiles, or right-angular pattern, preferred by the Yale Corporation and the town, Stiles commissioned James Hillhouse and John Trumbull to draft first college campus plan in the United States. Trumbull's drawings chose Stiles' linear pattern, interleaving narrow, steepled buildings between long student dormitories. By 1824, Old Brick Row included four student dormitories, then known as "colleges," and between them the Atheneum (First Chapel), Connecticut Lyceum, and Second Chapel. Around the Brick Row at this time were a chemical laboratory, a mineralogical building (the Cabinet), and the Second President's House, replacing one north of Elm Street.

The college gradually purchased parcels of land until it controlled the whole block by 1857. Properties owned by Amos Doolittle and Benjamin Franklin were consolidated and demolished, as were the town jail and poorhouse. On newly acquired land surrounding Old Brick Row, administrators built the Trumbull Gallery (1832), Divinity College (1835), the College Library (1849), and Alumni Hall (1850). Of the fourteen Yale buildings completed by 1850, only two, Connecticut Hall and the College Library (now Dwight Hall), would stand fifty years later, and both survive today.

Quadrangle plan
In 1870, Yale President Noah Porter announced the "gradual abandonment and removal of the present buildings of the Brick Row," beginning with the construction of Farnam Hall.  From 1870 to 1928, the college undertook a wholesale reconfiguration of its campus, tearing down the Old Brick Row and its satellites and erecting a perimeter of Victorian Gothic student dormitories around a central enclosure. Where before it had been most prestigious to live off campus, the new dormitories became fashionable as the preserve of seniors. When Yale's residential colleges were opened in 1933, the Old Campus transitioned to a home for the common Freshman Year, with upperclassmen living in the colleges.

Yale Fence

In 1833, a picket fence encircling the campus was replaced with a rail fence, causing a major shift in the social patterns of the Old Campus. The Yale Fence, a wood fence with square posts and round rails that ran three sides of Old Brick Row, was the college's primary gathering place thereafter.  Students would claim sections by class year, with seniors taking choice seats along Chapel Street.  However, as the modern quadrangle took form, the fence was gradually uprooted. In 1888, the displacement of its last section for Osborn Hall caused 2,100 alumni to write in protest.

The Yale Fence Club, an undergraduate fraternal organization, was named in its memory. The fence currently lining the Old Campus' interior courtyard is modeled after the old fence, and pieces of the original are held in Sterling Memorial Library.

Student life

Old Campus houses freshmen from ten of Yale College's fourteen residential colleges. These students are assigned a residential college before starting their studies at Yale, live in Old Campus dormitories during their freshman year, and move into their colleges at the beginning of sophomore year. Students assigned to Silliman, Timothy Dwight, Benjamin Franklin, and Pauli Murray live in their colleges for all four years.

Since the 18th century, Yale's Commencement ceremony has been held on the grounds of the Old Campus. Every May, approximately 10,000 chairs are set up for the event and college's Class Day, held the day before and featuring a distinguished speaker.

During the late 19th century, the Old Campus hosted an annual Tap Night for the upperclassmen on the Old Campus, where juniors were inducted into secret societies. An echo of the event occurs with the annual fall a cappella rush, where singing groups race to freshman dorms to choose new members. Old Campus hosts several curricular activities, including Freshman Olympics, a competition among the residential colleges, and Spring Fling, an outdoor concert. It also houses the Explo at Yale summer program for seven weeks during the summer.

Statues
There are bronze statues on Old Campus of Nathan Hale (1913, Bela Pratt), Theodore Dwight Woolsey (1896, John Ferguson Weir), and Abraham Pierson (1874, Launt Thompson). There are also statues of lions at the entrance to Lanman-Wright Hall. Before it was moved to Science Hill, a statue of Benjamin Silliman stood in front of Dwight Hall.

Copies of the Nathan Hale statue were cast for the Central Intelligence Agency and U.S. Department of Justice.

Current buildings

Former buildings

References

Works cited

Bibliography

Yale University buildings
University and college campuses in Connecticut
Urban planning in the United States